Otto Ludwig (March 9, 1903 in Orchard, California – January 14, 1983 in Los Angeles County, California) was a film editor who worked on American and British films.

Partial filmography

Midnight Mystery (1930)
Shooting Straight (1930)
 Sally in Our Alley (1931)
The Drums of Jeopardy (1931)
 A Honeymoon Adventure (1931)
 The Water Gipsies (1932)
 Nine till Six (1932)
 The Impassive Footman (1932)
 The Sign of Four (1932)
 Looking on the Bright Side (1932)
Brown on Resolution  (1935) 
You Can't Cheat an Honest Man (1939)
Beyond Tomorrow (1940)
 Timber (1942)
Saboteur (1942)
Cuban Pete (1946)
Inside Job (1946)
Something in the Wind (1947)
River Lady (1948)
Red Canyon (1949)
Sword in the Desert (1949)
The Desert Hawk (1950)
The Groom Wore Spurs (1951)
Rancho Notorious (1952)
The Steel Trap (1952)
The Moon is Blue (1953, for which he was nominated for the 1953 Academy Award for Film Editing)
Hot Blood (1956)
Solomon and Sheba (1959)

External links

1903 births
1983 deaths
American film editors
Burials at Forest Lawn Memorial Park (Hollywood Hills)